My Only Ü is a 2008 Filipino black comedy romance film directed by Cathy Garcia-Molina and starring Vhong Navarro and Toni Gonzaga (this was the second film since D' Anothers which released on July 27, 2005, 3 years ago). Produced and distributed by Star Cinema, the film was released October 29, 2008.

Plot
Bong (Vhong Navarro) has liked Winona (Toni Gonzaga) since time immemorial but he never had the courage to pursue her. Winona on the other hand, seems to be also showing interest in Bong, but he is too insensible to notice this. One day, in the tenement Bong is managing for his Aunt Lolit, he receives the final notes from the recently deceased neighborhood Doctor. Panying, Doc's assistant, hands Bong his result and just hands out Winona's. He checks out his letter and sees that the results are all negative. Bong is very healthy. However, as he opens Winona's envelope, fear drowns him because he knows about the so-called curse that all the women in Winona's family die before 25. Her mother died after giving birth at the age of 24, her older brother died of bangungot at age 21, her maternal aunt disappeared during Martial Law at 23, her grandmother died during World War II at age 20, her great-grandmother is said that she died of drowning at age 18, her greatest grandmother died of malaria at age 22, he ancestor was devoured by a dinosaur at age 19. Bong is aware that Winona is turning 25 soon and this letter might just confirm that curse. He opens the letter and sees the result. It is positive. Winona has lupus and she will die soon. Bong vows to make Winona's last remaining days happy and perfect. Bong goes through the whole montage of making life blissful for Winona. Winona and Bong become a lot closer to each other. They begin to fall in love. When Winona turned 25, she didn't die. She found the letter sent by the hospital. She discovers then that her results were all negative. She got mad because Bong has been keeping it a secret ever since.

Bong tried to apologize. But when Winona rejected his apology, he fainted and was hospitalized. That time, Winona was so worried so he took care of Bong. 
But one day he found out that he has a rare lung disease. At first he was sad but he became happy thinking that if Winona will die, he could die with her. As he was trying to tell Winona the 'good news', Winona was so happy and told him that she is not dying. The Doctor's assistant made a mistake with his notes. Winona was devastated after knowing that Bong is dying.

But despite all of this, Winona proposed to Bong. They died in a car accident after their marriage.

Cast and characters

Main cast
Toni Gonzaga as Winona Benigno Aunor
Vhong Navarro as Bonganvilla/Bong

Supporting cast
Janus del Prado as Ngorks		
Beauty Gonzalez as Marge		
Kitkat as Sheryll	
Vangie Labalan as Tita	 Lolit
Julius 'Empoy' Marquez as Romnick		
Arlene Muhlach as Delia	
Dennis Padilla as Raul
Benjie Paras as Doc Hector D. Doctor
Ronnie Magsanoc
John Lloyd Cruz as imaginary character
Sam Milby

References

External links
My Only Ü official website

2008 films
2008 romantic comedy films
Films about death
Films directed by Cathy Garcia-Molina
Philippine romantic comedy films
Star Cinema films